Olympique Lyonnais won Ligue 1 season 2005–06 of the French Association Football League with 84 points.

Participating teams

 Ajaccio
 Auxerre
 Bordeaux
 Le Mans
 Lens
 Lille
 Lyon
 Marseille
 Metz
 Monaco
 Nancy
 Nantes
 Nice
 Paris Saint-Germain
 Rennes
 Saint-Étienne
 Sochaux
 Strasbourg
 Toulouse
 Troyes

League table

Results

Top goalscorers

Player of the Month

References

External links
France 2005/06 at Rec.Sport.Soccer Statistics Foundation

Ligue 1 seasons
France
1